FC Khimvolokno Grodno was a Belarusian football club based in Grodno. The word 'Khimvolokno' means 'Synthetic Fibres' (literally 'chemical fibres'), and refers to the local Nylon 6 manufacturing plant.

History
1979: founded as Olimp Grodno
1990: renamed to Veras Grodno
1992: renamed to Khimvolokno Grodno

The team was playing in Belarusian SSR league from 1979 to 1991 and in Belarusian First League from 1992 till 1995. In late 1995 Khimvolokno Grodno was disbanded.

External links
Profile at footballfacts.ru

Association football clubs established in 1979
Association football clubs disestablished in 1995
Defunct football clubs in Belarus
1979 establishments in Belarus
1995 disestablishments in Belarus